"Cherry Pink and Apple Blossom White" or "Cerezo Rosa" or "Ciliegi Rosa" or "Gummy Mambo", is the English version of "Cerisiers Roses et Pommiers Blancs", a popular song with music by Louiguy written in 1950. French lyrics to the song by Jacques Larue and English lyrics by Mack David both exist, and recordings of both have been quite popular. However, Pérez Prado's recording of the song as an instrumental with his orchestra featuring trumpeter Billy Regis, whose trumpet sound would slide down and up before the melody would resume, was the most popular version. Pérez Prado's rendition was first recorded and released in Mexico in 1953 under the full title "Cerezo Rosa (Cherry Pink And Apple Blossom White)", becoming one of the biggest hits of that year in Mexico. It was then released in the United States in 1954, becoming a hit there in 1955 as it reached number one for 10 weeks on the Billboard chart. It became a gold record, and it was featured on the movie Underwater! (1955), where Jane Russell can be seen dancing to the song. Prado recorded Cherry Pink several times, the best known version being the original hit recording from 1953 and the 1960 recording in stereo.  Billboard ranked the former version as the No. 1 song of 1955. The most popular vocal version in the U.S. was by Alan Dale, reaching No. 14 on the chart in 1955.

In the United Kingdom, two versions of the song went to number one in 1955. The first was the version by Prado, which reached number one for two weeks. Less than a month later, a version by the British trumpeter Eddie Calvert reached number one for four weeks.

Al Hirt released a version on his 1965 album, They're Playing Our Song.

In 1982, the British pop group Modern Romance (featuring John Du Prez) had a UK Top 20 hit with the vocal version of the song.

In 1961, Jerry Murad's Harmonicats released an album featuring the song.

Recorded versions

André Claveau (original version in French, 1950)
Georgia Gibbs (1951)
Nilla Pizzi (in Italian, 1951)
Fotis Polymeris (in Greek, 1952)
Alan Dale (1955)
Pérez Prado (instrumental) (1955 and 1960)
Eddie Calvert (instrumental, 1955)
Chet Atkins 1955
Gyula/Jules Apatini (before october 1956 in Hungarian, "Nekem sem tanította senki sem" means "No one taught me either")
Pat Boone (1960)
Jerry Murad (1961)
Petula Clark (in French, 1962)
Lester Sterling (under the pseudonym Mr. Versatile; instrumental) (1969)
Norrie Paramor Orchestra (1977)
Mnozil Brass (2004)
Arthur Murray
Bill Black's Combo
Billy Vaughn
Bing Crosby recorded the song in 1955 for use on his radio show and it was subsequently included in the box set The Bing Crosby CBS Radio Recordings (1954-56) issued by Mosaic Records (catalog MD7-245) in 2009. 
Devo (as "Softcore Mutations" - unreleased)
Earl Bostic
Edmundo Ros
Gisele MacKenzie
Harry James
Horst Fischer
Hugo Montenegro
Ivo Robić (as "Jabuke i trešnje"; Croatian lyrics by Mario Kinel)
James Last Orchestra
John Barry
Lawrence Welk
Liberace
Lou Donaldson
Michel Legrand
Modern Romance
Nino Impallomeni
Ron Livingston
Ruben Pena
Spike Jones (under the pseudonym "Davey Crackpot"; a parody of the Perez Prado hit record featuring George Rock on trumpet)
Stanley Black
The Fabulous Thunderbirds
The Ventures
Xavier Cugat
Relly Coloma (1970) - Philippine Version under Villar Records

Finnish versions "Kaksi ruusua" ("Two Roses")
 Henry Theel (1955)
 Olavi Virta (1955)
 Erkki Junkkarinen (1975)
 Reijo Taipale (1975)
 Agents (1985)

In films
 The song was featured in the film Underwater! starring Jane Russell.
 The recording by Pérez Prado was featured in the films Cookie and Parents in 1989.
The song is often played in the Hong Kong film Cageman, most notably during the scene where tenants party while celebrating Mid-Autumn Festival.

See also
List of UK Singles Chart number ones of the 1950s

References

Number-one singles in the United States
1955 singles
1961 singles
1950 songs
Songs with lyrics by Mack David
UK Singles Chart number-one singles
Songs about flowers